North of the Rio Grande is a lost 1922 American silent Western film directed by Rollin S. Sturgeon and starring Bebe Daniels and Jack Holt.

Cast
 Jack Holt as Bob Haddington
 Bebe Daniels as Val Hannon
 Charles Ogle as Colonel Haddington
 Alec B. Francis as Father Hillaire
 Will Walling as John Hannon
 Jack Carlyle as Brideman
 Fred Huntley as Briston
 Shannon Day as Lola Sanchez
 Edythe Chapman - Belle Hannon
 George Field as Paul Perez
 Westcott Clarke as Clendenning

References

External links

 
 

1922 films
Lost Western (genre) films
Paramount Pictures films
1922 Western (genre) films
Lost American films
American black-and-white films
Films directed by Rollin S. Sturgeon
1922 lost films
Silent American Western (genre) films
1920s American films
1920s English-language films